Lauri Johannes Ylönen (born 23 April 1979) is a Finnish singer-songwriter, best known as the co-founder and frontman of the Finnish alternative rock band The Rasmus.

Biography

The Rasmus

When he and Heinonen started at Suutarila high school in the early 1990s, they met Pauli Rantasalmi and later Janne Heiskanen. Ylönen initiated the project of The Rasmus (then called just "Rasmus") in 1994, along with Eero Heinonen (bass) Pauli Rantasalmi (guitar), and Jarno Lahti (drums), with Lahti subsequently being replaced by Heiskanen. First, they called themselves Trashmosh, then Anttila, and at last Rasmus. They played their very first show before the winter break in school, 1994. They played songs with a style of rock and funk. Ylönen became the lead singer, composer and songwriter of the band. He quit school because the band took too much of his time.

In 1998, after having released three albums, Janne Heiskanen left and in 1999 Aki Hakala became The Rasmus' new drummer. In the same year, the band's former manager Teja Kotilainen left their current record label, Warner Music Finland. The band signed to Playground Music Scandinavia soon afterwards.

Dynasty
In 1999, an association called Dynasty was founded. The association consists of the three Finnish bands The Rasmus, Killer, and Kwan. The purpose of Dynasty was to signify allegiance and friendship between the bands and their members. Many members have tattoos or wear the Dynasty logotype on guitar straps. The bands have often worked together musically. Lauri has the tattoo on his arm as well as Pauli, Pauli also got the dynasty logo on his guitar (ESP LTD).

Side projects
Lauri sang co-vocals with Siiri Nordin, the singer of Killer, on a b-side version of the group's single, "All I Want".

In 2004, Ylönen recorded a song together with Apocalyptica and HIM's singer Ville Valo, named "Bittersweet". The song is available on Apocalyptica's self-titled album, Apocalyptica. It has also been released as a single and music video.

A year later, he released another song with Apocalyptica, named "Life Burns!". This song was also released as a single and music video. The musical genre was much heavier than "Bittersweet." "Life Burns!" is taken from the same album as "Bittersweet"
Ylönen also sang, with other members Kwan and Siiri Nordin of Killer, a song called "Chillin' at the Grotto" at a gala.

Ylönen's most recent project was composing the soundtrack of the Finnish movie "Blackout". The soundtrack was released in December 2008.

Solo career
Most recently, Ylönen announced a solo album scheduled for release in March 2011 with the first single Heavy being out in February. The material will have its premiere at Emma Gala  on February 26, 2011. Ylönen stated that he wanted several songs, that did not fit The Rasmus, to be released as a major record rather than a demo or something like that. The album will be self-produced with his record label Dynasty Recordings. In February 2011 the title of the album was revealed, New World.  It was later released on 30 March 2011 in Finland, with other European countries following. The first single was called Heavy, the video was shot by Owe Lingvall who had previously directed the singles Justify and October & April for The Rasmus. In May 2011 Lauri stated that In The City" would be the second single from his debut album. The video was shot in Las Vegas. Throughout the summer Lauri toured the Finnish summer festivals and even a few European countries, his next stop was Germany in September 2011. In late September it was revealed that a remixed version of What Are You Waiting For would be his next single. Ylönen announced via his official website that he would continue his European tour starting with two dates in Russia for 2012. Recently he was nominated for best Finnish Act for the MTV EMA'S 2011. He subsequently won this category and went on to be nominated in the Best Worldwide Act.

Personal life
He has a son named Julius, born in April 2008, with Finnish singer Paula Vesala whom he married on 8 November 2014 in Las Vegas. The couple filed a statement on 29 December 2014 and the marriage was registered in Helsinki, January 5, 2015. The family moved to Los Angeles in autumn 2014. In September 2016 it was reported that the couple had filed for divorce after being together for 12 years.

Ylönen is currently in a domestic partnership with a Finnish model Katriina Mikkola. The couple has two children together, a son named Oliver (born December 2017) and a daughter Ever Marlene (born 17 October 2021). The family resides in Hawaii.

Discography

Studio albums
With The Rasmus
1996 – Peep
1997 – Playboys
1998 – Hell of a Tester
2001 – Into
2003 – Dead Letters
2005 – Hide from the Sun
2008 – Black Roses
2012 – The Rasmus
2017 – Dark Matters

Solo-Discography

2011 – New World

References

 The Rasmus.com - official band biography Retrieved on 2005-18-09

External links

 The official website of Lauri's solo project
 The Rasmus' official website
 Lauri Ylönen at the Internet Movie Database

1979 births
Living people
Musicians from Helsinki
21st-century Finnish male singers
Finnish rock singers
English-language singers from Finland
20th-century Finnish male singers
Finnish expatriates in the United States
MTV Europe Music Award winners